David William Kelly (born 13 March 1947) is a British blues singer, guitarist and composer, who has been active on the British blues music scene since the 1960s. He has performed with the John Dummer Blues Band, Tramp, The Blues Band, and his own Dave Kelly Band.

His sister, Jo Ann Kelly, was also a blues singer, and she and Dave participated in many musical projects together.

Kelly is a disciple of Fred McDowell.

Discography

Albums
 Blues Leftovers (various artists) (1969 - Immediate)
 Keep It in the Family (1969 - Mercury)
 Dave Kelly (1971 - Mercury)
 Survivors (1979 - Appaloosa)
 Willing (1979 - Appaloosa)
 Feels Right (1981 - Cool King)
 Dave Kelly Band: Live (1983 - Appaloosa)
 Dave Kelly Band: Mind In A Glass (1985 Metronome)
 Dave Kelly Band: Heart of the City (1987 - Thunderbolt UK/Line Germany)
 Standing at the Crossroads (1988 - Inakustik / Inak Records)
 When the Blues Come To Call (1994 - Hypertension Music)
 Resting My Bones (2004 - Hypertension Music)
 We Had It All (2013 - Hypertension Music)

Bibliography
 Bane, M., (1982) White boy singin' the blues, London: Penguin, 1982,  .
 Bob Brunning, Blues: The British Connection, Helter Skelter Publishing,  London 2002,  - First edition 1986 - Second edition  1995 Blues in Britain
 Bob Brunning, The Fleetwood Mac Story: Rumours and Lies, Omnibus Press London, 1990 and 1998, 
 Martin Celmins, Peter Green - Founder of Fleetwood Mac, Sanctuary London, 1995, foreword by B.B.King, 
 Fancourt, L., (1989) British blues on record (1957–1970), Retrack Books.
 Dick Heckstall-Smith, The safest place in the world: A personal history of British Rhythm and blues, 1989 Quartet Books Limited,   - Second Edition : Blowing The Blues - Fifty Years Playing The British Blues, 2004, Clear Books, 
 Christopher Hjort, Strange brew: Eric Clapton and the British blues boom, 1965-1970, foreword by John Mayall, Jawbone 2007, 
 Paul Myers, Long John Baldry and the Birth of the British Blues, Vancouver 2007, GreyStone Books, 
 Harry Shapiro, Alexis Korner: The Biography, Bloomsbury Publishing PLC, London 1997, Discography by Mark Troster, 
 Schwartz, R. F., (2007) How Britain got the blues : The transmission and reception of American blues style in the United Kingdom Ashgate, .
 Mike Vernon, The Blue Horizon story 1965-1970 vol.1, notes of the booklet of the Box Set (60 pages)
 Paul Freestone, 'Eccentric Man: A Biography & Discography of Tony (TS) McPhee'. Incompetent Publishing.

References

External links

1947 births
Living people
English blues guitarists
English male guitarists
People from Streatham
Singers from London
English blues musicians
English blues singers
English male singers
English songwriters
English composers
Slide guitarists
The Blues Band members
John Dummer Band members
Tramp (band) members
British male songwriters